The Roanoke Star, also known as the Mill Mountain Star, is the world's largest freestanding illuminated man-made star, constructed in 1949 at the top of Mill Mountain in Roanoke, Virginia.

History 
In 1949, the Roanoke Merchants Association decided to kick off that year's Christmas shopping season by having a neon star built on top of Mill Mountain. Although the structure was always intended to be a permanent addition, the merchants at first weren't sure if the star should be lit year round. When the star immediately became very popular, the Chamber of Commerce and the Merchants Association decided to keep it lit all year. The Merchants Association is credited with the construction of the star, but no single person claimed credit.

Initially, the star was illuminated in all-white. Later, the star's color would change from white to red to indicate a traffic fatality on that day. As part of the bicentennial celebration in 1976, the design was changed to an outer single star of red encompassing inner double-stars of white and blue.  Generally all the colors have been lit at once, but occasionally the colors have been lit in a repeating sequence:  each color shows exclusively for a second or two, or in succession. To commemorate a tragic event, the red outer star has been used alone, in a manner akin to a lowered flag. Such commemorations have been made for national and local events. After the September 11, 2001 attacks, the star was kept in a red, white, and blue configuration for nearly six years, until April 2007.

On August 12, 2006, the star was turned off for eight days for the city to perform significant electrical upgrades. Outdated junction boxes, transformers, wiring, and conduits were replaced.  Many of these devices are from the star's original 1949 construction. The upgrades cost $100,000. The work is expected to save the city more money in the long run due to a reduced need for maintenance.

On April 17, 2007, the star had to be turned off because one of the power lines had been heavily damaged by a tree. When the star was relit on April 22, 2007, officials changed the color configuration to all-white "as a symbol of hope" after the Virginia Tech massacre.

Red, white and blue colors were restored May 24, 2007 and remained that way until returning to all white on September 12, 2011.

Construction 
It requires 17,500 watts of power to illuminate the neon tubes, so it puts out a pleasant little hum. Roy C. Kinsey of Kinsey Sign Company built the neon tubes with his three sons Roy Jr., Bob, and Warren. It was assembled near a local airplane hangar to study how it looked. Then it was driven to the top of the mountain and placed onto a steel structure. Robert L. Little was the Structural Engineer for Roanoke Iron & Bridge Works at the time and helped on the project as well.

Certain sections of the original red neon tubing still exist, while all of the white and blue sections have been replaced. Most maintenance on the star today involves the replacement of transformers and the repairing of circuit breakers.

The star was "lit" by Mayor A.R. Minton on November 23, 1949. Minton threw a "ceremonial" dummy switch, and Bob Kinsey flipped the actual switch behind the circuit breaker. Congressman Clifton A. Woodrum dedicated the star with the Biblical text, "When they saw the star they rejoiced with exceeding great joy." Mayor A. R. Minton threw the switch to light the star, and Greene Memorial Methodist Choir sang "America the Beautiful" and "The Star-Spangled Banner". James H. Moore, manager of WSLS radio, was the master of ceremonies."

Overlook and zoo 

Directly in front of the star is an overlook that features dramatic views of the Roanoke Valley and, particularly, downtown Roanoke. The overlook is a well known place to photograph Roanoke. It is also a site where area residents take visiting friends and relatives.

A small zoo was built near the star on the summit of Mill Mountain. Mill Mountain Zoo was originally designated as strictly a children's zoo, but the number of exhibits and variety of animals has expanded. The star, overlook, and zoo are accessible both from Roanoke and from a spur of the Blue Ridge Parkway at Roanoke Mountain. There are numerous hiking trails to the star, and from the star to the zoo.

From 1910 to 1929, an inclined railway ran from near the current location of Carilion Roanoke Memorial Hospital to the mountain's summit. The path of the incline is still visible today. The primary destination was an inn. A group dedicated to making Roanoke an attractive community for 40-year-olds has proposed rebuilding the inn.  David Bowers, former mayor, stated opposition to the park building proposal in his campaign, as did the Roanoke chapter of the Sierra Club and the Roanoke Valley Preservation Foundation.

The star and the park around it are popular picnic spots by day. They are also popular hangouts at night.

Mill Mountain's summit is  feet above sea level.

Gallery

References

External links 

 Roanoke Parks and Recreation: The Roanoke Star
 Roanoke.com Weekly Magazine: The Roanoke Star
 StarCam - The View from Mill Mountain (City of Roanoke)

Buildings and structures on the National Register of Historic Places in Virginia
Mountains of Virginia
Blue Ridge Mountains
National Register of Historic Places in Roanoke, Virginia
Buildings and structures in Roanoke, Virginia
Mountains of Roanoke County, Virginia
1949 establishments in Virginia